Gary Warren may refer to:

 Gary Warren (actor) (born 1954), British former child actor
 Gary Warren (footballer) (born 1984), English footballer